Ksaver Šandor Gjalski (26 October 1854 – 6 February 1935) was a Croatian writer and civil servant.

He was born Ljubomil Babić at Gredice, near Klanjec in Hrvatsko Zagorje into a minor aristocratic family. He finished high school in Varaždin and earned law degrees in Zagreb and Vienna in 1874.

Gjalski was involved in politics. In 1906, he was elected into the Croatian Parliament. From 1917 to 1918, he held the post of mayor of the Zagreb county. 

Gjalski wrote novels, but his best known work is Pod starim krovovima (Under Old Roofs), a collection of short stories in which he described the economic decline of the Croatian aristocracy. His writings were heavily inspired by Turgenev and Šenoa, as well as realism and romanticism in general.

Major works
Gjalski's major works are: U novom dvoru (1885), Pod starimi krovovi (1886), U noći (1887), Janko Borislavić (1887), Đurđica Agićeva (1889), Na rođenoj grudi (1890), Osvit (1892), Radmilović (1894), Za materinsku rieč (1902), Dolazak Hrvata (1924), Pronevjereni ideali (1925), etc.

References

1854 births
1935 deaths
People from Zabok
Croatian writers
Representatives in the Croatian Parliament (1848–1918)
Faculty of Law, University of Zagreb alumni
University of Vienna alumni